The Trentino-Alto Adige/Südtirol provincial elections of 2023 is set to take place on 22 October 2023.

Background

Since the 2018 Italian general election, many changes started to occur in the Trentino-Alto Adige/Südtirol political landscape. For the first time since the 1996 Italian general election, the centre-right coalition managed to defeat the centre-left coalition in Trentino in a general election. Shortly thereafter, the Trentino Tyrolean Autonomist Party (PATT) decided to run separately (German: Blockfrei), leading to the first victory of the Maurizio Fugatti-led centre-right coalition in a provincial election in Trentino since the start of the Second Italian Republic with the 1994 Italian general election.

In South Tyrol, the traditionally dominant-party system led by the South Tyrolean People's Party (SVP) lost its majority in the 2013 Trentino-Alto Adige/Südtirol provincial elections. In the 2018 general election, the SVP and the Democratic Party of the centre-left coalition lost their majority, forcing SVP to form a coalition with Lega due to the  system (Italian: proporzionale etnica). In the 2019 European Parliament election in Trentino-Alto Adige/Südtirol, the SVP broke their traditional alliance with the PD and joined forces with the centre-right Forza Italia. Similarly in the 2022 general election SVP and PATT decided to run separated from the centre-left and joined forced with some centre-right autonomist parties like Trentino Project.

After Brothers of Italy became largest party in Trentino in the 2022 general election, FdI proposed Francesca Gerosa as the new centre-right candidate. This led to a conflict with PATT, which joined the centre-right coalition in an election for the first time since 2001, which strongly spoke against her.

Trentino 

In Trentino, the president is elected directly by the people; the candidate who gains the most votes is elected president.

Parties and candidates

Opinion polling

South Tyrol

Parties

Opinion polling

References

2023 elections in Italy
Elections in Trentino-Alto Adige/Südtirol
October 2023 events in Italy